Graptolite Island is an island  long in the north-east part of Fitchie Bay, lying off the south-east portion of Laurie Island in the South Orkney Islands of Antarctica. James Weddell's chart published in 1825 shows two islands in essentially this position. Existence of a single island was determined in 1903 by the Scottish National Antarctic Expedition under William Speirs Bruce, who so named it because  what were thought to be graptolite fossils were found there. Later analysis showed that the fossils on Graptolite Island were merely the remains of ancient plants.

Important Bird Area
The island, along with the nearby Ferrier Peninsula, has been identified as an Important Bird Area (IBA) by BirdLife International because together they support a large breeding colony of about 91,000 pairs of Adélie penguins as well as 14,000 pairs of chinstrap penguins.

See also 
 List of Antarctic and subantarctic islands

References

Islands of the South Orkney Islands
Important Bird Areas of Antarctica
Penguin colonies